Adrian Robert Gostick is a British writer. He writes on employee engagement and organizational culture. In 2011, he founded The Culture Works, a Utah-based consulting firm. Among his notable books are The Carrot Principle, All In, and The Orange Revolution, co-authored with Chester Elton.

Early life

Gostick was born in Burton, England, the son of a Rolls-Royce draftsman father and a retail worker mother. In 1975, when he was 10 years old, his family emigrated to Canada. He served as an editor of the student paper at his Bachelor's Alma Mater.

Publications

Gostick co-authored 10 books with Chester Elton including:
 Managing with Carrots: Using Recognition to Attract and Retain the Best People (2001)  
 The 24-Carrot Manager: A Remarkable Story of How a Leader Can Unleash Human Potential (2002) 
 A Carrot a Day: A Daily Dose of Recognition for Your Employees (2004) 
 The Invisible Employee: Realizing the Hidden Potential in Everyone (2006) 
 The Carrot Principle (Reissue, 2009) 
 The Daily Carrot Principle: 365 Ways to Enhance Your Career and Life (2010) 
 The Orange Revolution: How One Great Team can Transform an Entire Organization (2010) 
 All In: How The Best Managers Create a Culture of Belief and Drive Big Results (2012) 
 What Motivates Me: Put Your Passions to Work (2014) 
 The Best Team Wins: The New Science of High Performance (2014) 
 Leading with Gratitude: Eight Leadership Practices for Extraordinary Business Results (2020)

References 

Brigham Young University alumni
1965 births
Living people
Place of birth missing (living people)
British writers